Inape eltabloana is a species of moth of the family Tortricidae. It is found in Ecuador (Tungurahua Province).

The ground colour of the forewings is cream, in the distal part of the wing irregularly suffused with pale orange ferruginous. The hindwings are cream, with greyish dots.

Etymology
The species name refers to El Tablon, the type locality.

References

External links

Moths described in 2009
Fauna of Ecuador
eltabloana
Moths of South America
Taxa named by Józef Razowski